The Journal of Neuropsychiatry and Clinical Neurosciences is a quarterly peer-reviewed medical journal in the field of neuropsychiatry. It was established in 1989 by Stuart Yudofsky and Robert Hales, with its first issue published that winter. It has been the official journal of the American Neuropsychiatric Association since 1991. It is published by the American Psychiatric Association and the Editor is David B. Arciniegas, MD, FANPA (University of New Mexico School of Medicine). According to the Journal Citation Reports, the journal has a 2020 impact factor of 2.192. The publisher reports a journal H-index of 104, with more than 62,000 citations to articles published in the journal and an average of over 18 citations per item.

References

External links

American Psychiatric Association academic journals
Neuropsychiatry
Psychiatry journals
Publications established in 1989
Quarterly journals
Academic journals associated with learned and professional societies of the United States
English-language journals